Xenohammus is a genus of longhorn beetles of the subfamily Lamiinae, containing the following species:

 Xenohammus albomaculatus Wang & Chiang, 2000
 Xenohammus assamensis (Breuning, 1935)
 Xenohammus bimaculatus Schwarzer, 1931
 Xenohammus flavoguttatus Pu, 1999
 Xenohammus griseomarmoratus Breuning, 1956
 Xenohammus lumawigi Breuning, 1980
 Xenohammus nebulosus Schwarzer, 1931
 Xenohammus nigromaculatus (Pic, 1926)
 Xenohammus quadriplagiatus Breuning, 1938

References

Lamiini